Kayapınar is one of Diyarbakır's central districts in Turkey. In the local elections of 31 March 2019, Keziban Yılmaz was elected Mayor with 66,35% of the votes. On the 21 October 2019, he was detained due to an investigation concerning propaganda for a terror organization and being a member of a terror organization.

During the Mayorship of Zülküf Karatekin, there was an unnamed park in the town. The Kayapinar ... Park was named Rosna by the Municipality  in 2008, but this name was rejected by the Governorship of Kayapinar. An other park was the Medya Park in which a pool allegedly in the shape of a Kurdistan was located. Karatekin was investigated for being involved in the construction of the pool in 2007. The Ceylan Önkol park was inaugurated in 2010 to which inauguration Karatekin sent a letter from prison.

References 

Districts of Diyarbakır Province
Kurdish settlements in Turkey